Victory Gardens is a borough in Morris County, in the U.S. state of New Jersey. As of the 2020 United States census, the borough's population was 1,582, an increase of 62 (+4.1%) from the 2010 census count of 1,520, which in turn reflected a decline of 26 (−1.7%) from the 1,546 counted in the 2000 census. The borough is the fourth-smallest municipality by area in the state.

Victory Gardens is Morris County's smallest municipality, measured both by size and population, and its most densely populated.

History
The origins of the borough began in 1941, when the federal government acquired  in Randolph Township as the site of a 300-unit housing project for war industry employees. The borough's name is derived from the victory gardens planted at homes and parks during World War II to provide additional supplies of fruits and vegetables. Streets are named for U.S. Presidents.

Randolph Township residents approved a referendum as part of a September 1951 special election in which voters were asked if the township's Victory Gardens neighborhood should be removed from the township and created as an independent municipality for its 1,300 residents covering . Residents of other areas of Randolph Township argued that the compensation paid by the federal government for the more than 250 students attending the Randolph Township Schools did not adequately cover the cost of their public education, that the housing and other structures in Victory Gardens was out of compliance with the Township's building and zoning ordinances and that the overwhelming Democratic Party political leanings of residents of Victory Gardens were out of sync with the largely Republican Party township.

Victory Gardens was incorporated as a borough by an act of the New Jersey Legislature on June 20, 1951, from portions of Randolph Township, based on the results of the referendum passed on September 18, 1951.

The small town made news on November 16, 1958, when 262 members of its 297 families participated voluntarily as "refugees" in a civil defense exercise, while other residents of the town — "school boys with Geiger counters, staff men with fancy helmets, girls with typewriters, Explorer Scouts, police and fire crews, medical teams and the dozens who just washed pots and pans and ladled stew" — volunteered to assist. "Those who remained home," The New York Times wrote, "were restricted in their movements by guards who patrolled the town."

A project approved in 1973 brought the construction of 184 units of garden apartments on a site covering , providing additional rateables and offering permanent housing for an estimated 400 people, that would contrast with the temporary original structures built in the 1940s that had long passed their expected lifespan.

Geography
According to the United States Census Bureau, the borough had a total area of 0.15 square miles (0.38 km2), all of which was land.

The borough borders the Morris County municipalities of Dover and Randolph.

Demographics

2010 census

The Census Bureau's 2006–2010 American Community Survey showed that (in 2010 inflation-adjusted dollars) median household income was $53,269 (with a margin of error of +/− $3,599) and the median family income was $52,500 (+/− $6,885). Males had a median income of $34,063 (+/− $5,135) versus $33,750 (+/− $9,755) for females. The per capita income for the borough was $18,340 (+/− $1,640). About 11.9% of families and 16.3% of the population were below the poverty line, including 26.6% of those under age 18 and none of those age 65 or over.

2000 census
As of the 2000 United States census there were 1,546 people, 564 households, and 381 families residing in the borough. The population density was 10,582.6 people per square mile (3,979.4/km2). There were 588 housing units at an average density of 4,025.0 per square mile (1,513.5/km2). The racial makeup of the borough was 51.36% White, 21.41% African American, 0.06% Native American, 5.43% Asian, 15.27% from other races, and 6.47% from two or more races. Hispanic or Latino of any race were 50.65% of the population.

15.27% of Victory Gardens residents identified themselves as being of Colombian ancestry in the 2000 Census, the highest percentage of the population of any municipality in the United States.

There were 564 households, out of which 39.7% had children under the age of 18 living with them, 43.3% were married couples living together, 17.9% had a female householder with no husband present, and 32.3% were non-families. 25.2% of all households were made up of individuals, and 2.7% had someone living alone who was 65 years of age or older. The average household size was 2.74 and the average family size was 3.21.

In the borough the population was spread out, with 26.5% under the age of 18, 9.6% from 18 to 24, 39.3% from 25 to 44, 19.2% from 45 to 64, and 5.4% who were 65 years of age or older. The median age was 32 years. For every 100 females, there were 92.5 males. For every 100 females age 18 and over, there were 87.3 males.

The median income for a household in the borough was $44,375, and the median income for a family was $43,594. Males had a median income of $32,841 versus $24,875 for females. The per capita income for the borough was $20,616. About 8.9% of families and 8.4% of the population were below the poverty line, including 10.4% of those under age 18 and 10.5% of those age 65 or over.

Government

Local government

Victory Gardens is governed under the Borough form of New Jersey municipal government, which is used in 218 municipalities (of the 564) statewide, making it the most common form of government in New Jersey. The governing body is comprised of the Mayor and the Borough Council, with all positions elected at-large on a partisan basis as part of the November general election. The Mayor is elected directly by the voters to a four-year term of office. The Borough Council is comprised of six members elected to serve three-year terms on a staggered basis, with two seats coming up for election each year in a three-year cycle. The Borough form of government used by Victory Gardens is a "weak mayor / strong council" government in which council members act as the legislative body with the mayor presiding at meetings and voting only in the event of a tie. The mayor can veto ordinances subject to an override by a two-thirds majority vote of the council. The mayor makes committee and liaison assignments for council members, and most appointments are made by the mayor with the advice and consent of the council.

, the Mayor of Victory Gardens is Democrat David L. Holeman Jr., whose term of office ends December 31, 2024. Members of the Borough Council are Vera C. Cheatham (D, 2022), Ondria Garcia-Montes (D, 2024), James R. Glass (D, 2022), Stuart Hale (D, 2022), Kendyll Hedgepath (D, 2024) and Ismael Lorenzo Sr. (D, 2023).

Joan Cegelka won election in November 2013 to serve the balance of the term expiring in 2014 that had been held by David Holeman before he took office as mayor, with Vera Cheatham winning re-election to a full three-year term and Independent Hector Lorenzo Jr. knocking off incumbent Sonia Hall for terms starting January 1, 2014.

In December 2010, Councilmember Ondria Garcia-Montes was placed on probation for 12 months after an incident in which she falsely told police that a criminal suspect who was the subject of a search warrant was not in her apartment.

Dover serves as the lead agency operating a joint municipal court that include Victory Gardens and the neighboring municipalities of Mine Hill Township, Mount Arlington and Wharton. Established in 2009, the joint municipal court was forecast to offer annual savings in excess of $250,000 over the 10-year life of the agreement.

In 2018, the borough had an average property tax bill of $4,417, the lowest in the county, compared to an average bill of $10,480 in Morris County and $8,767 statewide.

Federal, state and county representation
Victory Gardens is located in the 11th Congressional District and is part of New Jersey's 25th state legislative district.

 

Morris County is governed by a Board of County Commissioners comprised of seven members who are elected at-large in partisan elections to three-year terms on a staggered basis, with either one or three seats up for election each year as part of the November general election. Actual day-to-day operation of departments is supervised by County Administrator, John Bonanni. , Morris County's Commissioners are
Commissioner Director Tayfun Selen (R, Chatham Township, term as commissioner ends December 31, 2023; term as director ends 2022),
Commissioner Deputy Director John Krickus (R, Washington Township, term as commissioner ends 2024; term as deputy director ends 2022),
Douglas Cabana (R, Boonton Township, 2022), 
Kathryn A. DeFillippo (R, Roxbury, 2022),
Thomas J. Mastrangelo (R, Montville, 2022),
Stephen H. Shaw (R, Mountain Lakes, 2024) and
Deborah Smith (R, Denville, 2024).
The county's constitutional officers are the County Clerk and County Surrogate (both elected for five-year terms of office) and the County Sheriff (elected for a three-year term). , they are 
County Clerk Ann F. Grossi (R, Parsippany–Troy Hills, 2023),
Sheriff James M. Gannon (R, Boonton Township, 2022) and
Surrogate Heather Darling (R, Roxbury, 2024).

Politics

Every Democratic Party nominee for president since at least Jimmy Carter has carried Victory Gardens.

As of March 23, 2011, there were a total of 523 registered voters in Victory Gardens, of which 234 (44.7%) were registered as Democrats, 58 (11.1%) were registered as Republicans and 231 (44.2%) were registered as Unaffiliated. There were no voters registered to other parties.

In the 2013 gubernatorial election, Republican Chris Christie and Democrat Barbara Buono each received 48.4% of the vote (90 cast), ahead of other candidates with 3.2% (6 votes), among the 224 ballots cast by the borough's 556 registered voters (38 ballots were spoiled), for a turnout of 40.3%. In the 2009 gubernatorial election, Democrat Jon Corzine received 58.4% of the vote (118 ballots cast), ahead of Republican Chris Christie with 27.2% (55 votes), Independent Chris Daggett with 8.4% (17 votes) and other candidates with 0.5% (1 votes), among the 202 ballots cast by the borough's 544 registered voters, yielding a 37.1% turnout.

Education
Victory Gardens is a non-operating school district, with all public school students in kindergarten through twelfth grade in Victory Gardens attending the schools of the Dover School District in Dover, which has been consolidated between the two municipalities since 2010. As of the 2021–22 school year, the district, comprised of five schools, had an enrollment of 3,448 students and 244.6 classroom teachers (on an FTE basis), for a student–teacher ratio of 14.1:1. Schools in the district (with 2021–22 enrollment from the National Center for Education Statistics) are 
Academy Street Elementary School with 470 students in grades K-6, 
East Dover Elementary School with 389 students in grades K-6, 
North Dover Elementary School with 658 students in grades PreK-6, 
Dover Middle School with 524 students in grades 7-8 and 
Dover High School with 1,094 students in grades 9-12. Public school students in grades 7–12 from Mine Hill Township attend Dover Middle School and Dover High School as part of a sending/receiving relationship with the Mine Hill School District. The high school was recognized with the National Blue Ribbon School Award in 2013.

Transportation

Roads and highways

County Route 665 (South Salem Street) runs through the northwest corner of the borough, connecting Randolph on both sides.

Public transportation
NJ Transit offers local bus service on the 875 route. NJ Transit had previously offered service in the borough on the MCM2 and MCM7 routes.

References

External links

 Victory Gardens Borough website
 Dover School District
 
 School Data for the Dover School District, National Center for Education Statistics
 Daily Record regional area newspaper

Colombian-American culture
 
1951 establishments in New Jersey
Borough form of New Jersey government
Boroughs in Morris County, New Jersey
New Jersey District Factor Group none
Populated places established in 1951